Lalit Rajeshwori Rajya Lakshmi Devi (1854–1917) was the Crown Princess of Prince Trailokya of Nepal. She was the mother of Prithvi of Nepal, King of Nepal.

Biography 
Lalit was the second daughter of Commanding-General Sir Jang Bahadur Kunwar Ranaji, Maharaja of Lambjang and Kaski, GCB, GCSI, Prime Minister and Colonel-in-chief of Nepal, by his wife, Hiranya Garbha Kumari Devi, youngest daughter of Sri Chautaria Prana Shah.

She married Trailokya, Crown Prince of Nepal in Thapathali Durbar, Kathmandu, on 10 June 1860, in a double ceremony with her sister, Somgarva Divyeshwari Rajya Lakshmi Devi (second and third wives of Trailokya; the first wife was their other sister, Tara Rajya Lakshmi Devi).

She was Regent for her son since 17 May 1881 until 8 August 1893

She was named Tower Sri Panch.

References

Nepalese queens consort
1917 deaths
1854 births
20th-century Nepalese nobility
19th-century Nepalese nobility
Children of prime ministers of Nepal
Nepalese Hindus